Rajagopala Kulashekharan or R. K. Shekhar (21 June 1933 – 09 September 1976) was an Indian music composer who worked mainly for Malayalam movies. He composed music for 52 films (23 in Malayalam with 127 songs), and was the music conductor for more than 100 films. He is the father of music composers and singers A. R. Rahman and A. R. Reihana. His grandsons G. V. Prakash Kumar and A. R. Ameen are also involved in music production.

His debut song as a music director was "Chotta Muthal Chudala Vare" ("from cradle to grave"), which was a big hit in Kerala. This was composed for the film Pazhassi Raja (1964).

Early life
He was born to a Tamil Agamudaya Mudhaliyar family in Tiruvallur to K. Rajagopalan or Rajagopalan Bhagavathar, a harikathai exponent. His entry into film music was opened through his extraordinary performances on harmonium for theatre plays. He started his career in the film industry as an assistant to music director M. B. Sreenivasan. Later on he conducted and arranged music for famous Malayalam music directors M. K. Arjunan and V. Dakshinamoorthy. He was so fascinated by the tunes created by these legends, that he would work very hard single-handedly to create the BGM of the songs they tuned to match their purity and standard, thus making the songs evergreen and on par. Their association lasted till his death.

Career

His career as an independent music composer started with the 1964 film Pazhassi Raja, of which the philosophical song "Chotta Muthal Chudala Vare" became a big hit. After his next work in Aisha, he turned back to arranging and conducting for other composers.

After a gap of 7 years, he returned to music composing through the film Anaathashilpangal in 1971. Apart from arranging the hits like Ninmaniarayile and Neela Nishidhini C.I.D. Nazir 1971 for director P. Venu, he composed music for his next film Taxi Car in 1972. Then he went on to compose music for about 20 films. Due to the failure of these films in the box office, his songs went unnoticed and he lacked to get more opportunities for composing. His close friend in the industry was composer M. K. Arjunan. Starting from Arjunan master's first film, Shekhar assisted him in all his films till his death. Continuous hard work made Shekhar's health condition worse. In all these days, Arjunan master was the caretaker of him and his family.

He composed tunes for his last film  Chottanikkara Amma when he was in bed for treatment and he died leaving the project incomplete. Later on, M.K. Arjunan completed the project by arranging and recording the songs that Shekhar composed.

Family
R. K. Shekhar was married to Kasthuri Shekhar (later Kareema Begum; d. 2020). Their marriage took place in the most prominent Hindu shrine in India, the Tirumala Venkateswara Temple located in Tirupati. Shekhar and Kasthuri had four children, A. R. Reihana, Allah Rakha Rahman (born A. S. Dileep Kumar), Fathima Rafiq and Ishrath Qadri. Shekhar died on 9th September 1976 at the young age of 43. His grandchildren include Reihana's son G.V. Prakash Kumar and Rahman's son A. R. Ameen.

The family fell on hard times after Shekhar's death and came under the guidance of Sufi peer Karimullah Shah Qadri, later converting to Islam with Rahman's name being suggested by a Hindu astrologer.

Filmography
 Pazhassi Raja (1964)
 Ayish
 Anadha Shilpangal
 Yogamullaval
 Sumangali
 Akashaganga
 Aradi Manninte Janmi
 Kandavarundo?
 Taxi Car (1972)
 Miss Mary
 Thottilla
 Thiruvabharanam
 Kapalika
 Chithariya Pookkal
 Pattabhishekham
 Nadeenadanmare Avashyamundu
 Thamarathoni
 Pen Pada
 Priyae Ninakku Vendi
 Velicham Akale
 Kuttichathan
 Yudhabhoomi
 Thiruvonam (film)  (Background score)
 Chottanikkara Amma'' (1976)

References

External links
 Interview with A R Rahman

1933 births
1976 deaths
Malayalam film score composers
Tamil film score composers
Tamil musicians
Musicians from Chennai
20th-century Indian composers
Indian male film score composers
20th-century male musicians